The Golden Square (al-Murabbaʿ al-dhahabī) or Four Colonels (al-ʿiqdā' al-arbaʿa) was a cabal of pro-fascist army officers of the Iraqi armed forces who played a part in Iraqi politics throughout the 1930s and early 1940s. They conspired to overthrow the Hashemite monarchy in Iraq and expel the British presence in Iraq. The activities of the Golden Square culminated in supporting Rashid Ali al-Gaylani in his overthrow of government in 1941, briefly instituting the Golden Square National Defense Government. However, the Anglo-Iraqi War resulted in the disbandment of the Golden Square.

Details
The Golden Square included the four most important leaders of the "Circle of Seven". The Circle of Seven was a group of Sunni Arab nationalist military officers who were greatly influenced by German Ambassador Fritz Grobba and, in turn, greatly influenced politics in Iraq during the 1930s and early 1940s.

Members
The members of the Golden Square were Colonel Salah al-Din al-Sabbagh, Colonel Kamil Shabib, Colonel Fahmi Said, and Colonel Mahmud Salman. During the Anglo-Iraqi War, the four members of the Golden Square commanded units located in the Baghdad area. Salah ad-Din al-Sabbagh was commander of the Iraqi 3rd Infantry Division. Kamal Shabib commanded the 1st Infantry Division. Fahmi Said commanded the Independent Mechanized Brigade. Mahmud Salman, the one non-Army officer, was the chief of the Air Force.

The members of the Golden Square were virulently anti-British. In time, these men represented real power as successive Iraqi governments sought the support of the military for survival. The members of the Golden Square looked to Nazi Germany to support them and, for his part, Grobba enthusiastically encouraged them to do so.

Iraqi coup d'état
On 1 April 1941, Rashid Ali and the Golden Square launched a coup d'etat to topple the government of the regent, Prince 'Abd al-Ilah. The subsequent Anglo-Iraqi War ended disastrously for Rashid Ali and the members of the Golden Square who, for the most part, fled Iraq as the British closed in on Baghdad. Shabib, Said, Salman, Sabbagh were all eventually returned to Iraq and executed.

See also
 Iraqi Army
 Iraqi Air Force
 Party of National Brotherhood

Notes

References 

 
1941 disestablishments in Iraq
20th century in Iraq
Arab nationalist organizations
Far-right politics in Asia
Fascism in the Arab world